Audunborg  (Auduns borg) was a castle and fortification built by Norwegian nobleman Audun Hugleiksson on his inherited estate near the village of Ålhus on the shores of the Jølstravatn in the municipality of Jølster in Vestland county, Norway.

History
The castle was built in stone sometime between 1276 to 1286, probably by English craftsmen working out of Bergen. It had large windows and arches. The building itself had water on three sides and was thus easy to defend. It is also thought that a moat or castle wall was part of the fortifications. Recent research claims that Audun himself spent little time in his castle as his activities kept him either in Bergen, in the east of the country or abroad. As a baron, Audun Hugleiksson was allowed to keep a hird (armed retinue) a right otherwise reserved for the king. This hird would defend him on his travels and when he was at home in Audunborg.

In Medieval Norway, typically  only the King and the Church had the funds to build in stone and Audunborg along with Isegran by Glomma, built by Alv Erlingsson, are the only two known examples of private stone castles in Norway. Stories about Audun remain in local folklore and one story includes him burying all his money and sinking a silver table into the Jølstravatn before departing for his last trip to Bergen.

Castle ruins 
Today, only the ruins remain of the castle that stood at the tip of Hegreneset by Jølstravatn in Sunnfjord. It was first excavated by Gerhard Fischer in 1934 and is probably modelled after Håkonshallen in Bergen which was twice as long and twice as wide. A memorial at  Audunborg, carved by Jørgen P. Solheimsnes from Jølster, was erected on the site of the former castle in 1960. Its motif is the baron's seal.

There was a play performed called Audun Hugleiksson – Kongens mann which commemorates the life of Audun Hugleiksson. The play 
was written by Edvard Hoem  and based on the book Kongens sendebod : Audun Hugleikson 1240-1302 which was written by  Anne Cecilie Kapstad and illustrated by Ludvig Eikaas.

Media gallery

References

Other sources
Kapstad, Anne Cecilie; Ludvig Eikaas  (2000) Kongens sendebod : Audun Hugleikson 1240 - 1302 (Vassenden : Haugland forl.)

External links 
 Baron Audun Hugleiksson (NRK)
 Audun Hugleiksson (Statsarkivet i Bergen) 
 Teaterstykket – Audun Hugleiksson – Kongens Mann (the play)

Castles in Norway
Forts in Norway
Ruins in Norway
Military installations in Vestland